Deep sea mining is a growing subfield of experimental seabed mining that involves the retrieval of minerals and deposits from the ocean floor found at depths of , up to . As of 2021, the majority of marine mining efforts are limited to shallow coastal waters only, where sand, tin and diamonds are more readily accessible. There are three types of deep sea mining that have generated great interest: polymetallic nodule mining, polymetallic sulphide mining, and the mining of cobalt-rich ferromanganese crusts. The vents create globular or massive sulfide deposits, which contain valuable metals such as silver, gold, copper, manganese, cobalt, and zinc. The deposits are mined using either hydraulic pumps or bucket systems that take ore to the surface to be processed.

Marine minerals include sea-dredged and seabed minerals. Sea-dredged minerals are normally extracted by dredging operations within coastal zones, to maximum sea depths of about 200 m. Minerals normally extracted from these depths include sand, silt and mud for construction purposes, mineral rich sands such as ilmenite and diamonds.

As with all mining operations, deep sea mining raises questions about its environmental impact. There is a growing debate about whether deep sea mining should be allowed. Environmental advocacy groups such as Greenpeace and the Deep Sea Mining Campaign have argued that seabed mining should not be permitted in most of the world's oceans because of the potential for damage to deep sea ecosystems and pollution by heavy metal-laden plumes. Prominent environmental activists and state leaders have also called for moratoriums or total bans due to the potential of devastating environmental impacts. Some argue that there should be a total ban on seabed mining. Some anti-seabed mining campaigns have won the support of large industry such as some of the technology giants, and large car companies. However, these same companies will be increasingly reliant on the metals seabed minerals can provide. Some scientists argue that seabed mining should not go ahead, as we know such a relatively small amount about the biodiversity of the deep ocean environment. Individual countries with significant deposits of seabed minerals within their large EEZ’s are making their own decisions pertaining to seabed mining, exploring ways of undertaking seabed mining without causing too much damage to the deep ocean environment, or deciding not to develop seabed mines.
Some companies are attempting to build polymetallic deep sea mining equipment which does no serious harm and preservers the marine habitat.

As of 2022 there was no commercial mining of seabed minerals. However, the International Seabed Authority has granted 19 exploration licenses for polymetallic nodules, within the Clarion Clipperton Zone. 
The Cook Islands Seabed Minerals Authority (SBMA) has granted 3 exploration licenses for polymetallic nodules within their EEZ.

There is the potential for mining at a range of scales within the oceans from small to very large. Technologies involved in the mining of seabed minerals would be highly technological, and involve a range of robotic mining machines, as well as surface ships, and metal refineries at onshore locations. One vision for the post-fossil fuel world will rely on wind farms, solar energy, electric cars, and improved battery technologies: these use a high volume and wide range of metallic commodities including ‘green’ or ‘critical’ metals many of which are in relatively short supply. Seabed mining could provide a near-term solution to the provision of many of these metals, though only serves to worsen the fundamental problems posed by extraction.

Mining sites 
Deep sea mining is a relatively new mineral retrieval process undergoing research which takes place on the ocean floor. Ocean mining sites are usually around large areas of polymetallic nodules or active and extinct hydrothermal vents at about 3,000 – 6,500 meters below the ocean's surface. The vents create sulfide deposits, which contain precious metals such as silver, gold, copper, manganese, cobalt, and zinc. The deposits are mined using either hydraulic pumps or bucket systems that take ore to the surface to be processed.

Types of minerals 
Seabed minerals are mostly located between 1 and 6 km beneath the ocean surface and comprise three main types:

 Polymetallic or Manganese nodules are found between 4 and 6 km beneath the sea surface, largely within abyssal plain environments. Manganese and related hydroxides precipitate from ocean water or sediment-pore water around a nucleus, which may be a shark’s tooth or a quartz grain, forming potato-shaped nodules some 4–14 cm in diameter. They accrete very slowly at rates of 1–15 mm per million years. Polymetallic/Manganese nodules are rich in many elements including rare earths, cobalt, nickel, copper, molybdenum, lithium, and Yttrium. The largest deposits of Polymetallic Nodules occur in the Pacific Ocean between Mexico and Hawaii in an area called the Clarion Clipperton Fracture Zone. The Cook Islands contains the world’s fourth largest Polymetallic Nodule deposit in an area called the South Penrhyn basin close to the Manihiki Plateau.
 Polymetallic or seabed massive sulfide deposits that form in active oceanic tectonic settings such as island arcs and back-arcs and mid ocean ridge environments. These deposits are associated with hydrothermal activity and hydrothermal vents at sea depths of mostly between 1 and 4 km. Polymetallic Sulfide minerals are rich in copper, gold, lead, silver and other metals. They are found within the Mid Atlantic Ridge system, around Papua New Guinea, Solomon Islands, Vanuatu, and Tonga and other similar ocean environments around the world.
 Cobalt-rich crusts (CRC’s) form on sediment free rock surfaces, around oceanic seamounts, ocean plateau and other elevated topographic features within the ocean. The deposits are found at depths of 600–7000 m beneath sea level and form ‘carpets’ of polymetallic rich layers about 30 cm thick at the surface of the elevated features. Crusts are rich in a range of metals including cobalt, tellurium, nickel, copper, platinum, zirconium, tungsten and rare earth elements. They are found in many parts of all oceans such as seamounts in the Atlantic and Indian Oceans, as well as countries such as the Federated States of Micronesia, Marshall Islands, and Kiribati.

The deep sea contains many different resources available for extraction, including silver, gold, copper, manganese, cobalt, and zinc. These raw materials are found in various forms on the sea floor.

Diamonds are also mined from the seabed by De Beers and others.

Cobalt-rich ferromanganese formations are found at various depths between 400 and 7000 meters below sea level (masl). These formations are a type of Manganese crust deposits. The substrates of rock consist of layered iron and Magnesium layers ( Fe-Mn oxyhydroxide deposits ) that will host mineralization.

Temperature, depth and sources of seawater are dependent variables that shape how the formations grow. Hydrothermal crusts precipitate quickly, near 1600–1800 mm/Ma and grow in hydrothermal fluids at approximately 200 °C. Hydrogenetic crusts grow much slower at 1–5 mm/Ma but will have higher concentrations of critical metals.

Submarine seamount provinces, linked to hotspots and seafloor spreading, vary in depth along the ocean floor.  These seamount show characteristics distribution that connects them to Cobalt-rich ferromanganese formation. In Western Pacific, a study conducted at <1500 m to 3500 m (mbsl) proved that the cobalt crusts are concentrated in the seamount section that slops at less than 20°. The high-grade cobalt crust  in the Western Pacific trended /correlated with latitude and longitude, a high region within 150°E‐140°W and 30°S‐30°N

Polymetallic sulphides are resources available for extraction from Seafloor massive sulfide deposits, composed on and within the seafloor base when mineralized water discharges from Hydrothermal vent. The hot mineral-rich water precipitates and condenses when released from hydrothermal vents and meets the cold seawater. The stock area of the chimney structures of hydrothermal vents can be highly mineralized.

Polymetallic nodules/manganese nodules are founded on Abyssal plain, in a range of sizes, some as large as 15 cm long. The Clipperton Fracture Zone (CCZ) is a well known area of occurrences. Nodules are recorded to have average growth rates near 10–20 mm/Ma.

The Clipperton Fracture Zone is host to the largest untapped deposit nickel resource; Polymetallic nodules or Manganese nodule sit on the seafloor. These nodules require no need for drilling or typical Surface mining techniques. The composition of nickel, cobalt, copper and manganese make up nearly 100% of the nodules, and generates no toxic tailings. Polymetallic nodules in the Clipperton Fracture Zone are currently being studied to produce battery metals.

Deep sea mining efforts 
Over the past decade, a new phase of deep-sea mining has begun. Rising demand for precious metals in Japan, China, Korea and India has pushed these countries in search of new sources. Interest has recently shifted toward hydrothermal vents as the source of metals instead of scattered nodules. The trend of transition towards an electricity-based information and transportation infrastructure currently seen in western societies further pushes demands for precious metals. The current revived interest in phosphorus nodule mining at the seafloor stems from phosphor-based artificial fertilizers being of significant importance for world food production. Growing world population pushes the need for artificial fertilizers or greater incorporation of organic systems within agricultural infrastructure.

The world's first "large-scale" mining of hydrothermal vent mineral deposits was carried out by Japan in August - September, 2017. Japan Oil, Gas and Metals National Corporation (JOGMEC) carried out this operation using the Research Vessel Hakurei. This mining was carried out  at the 'Izena hole/cauldron' vent field within the hydrothermally active back-arc basin known as the Okinawa Trough which contains 15 confirmed vent fields according to the InterRidge Vents Database.

A deep sea mining venture in Papua New Guinea, the Solwara 1 Project, was granted a mining permit to begin mining a high grade copper-gold resource from a weakly active hydrothermal vent. This controversial project generated an enormous backlash from the community and environmental activists The Solwara 1 Project was located at 1600 metres water depth in the Bismarck Sea, New Ireland Province. Using ROV (remotely operated underwater vehicles) technology developed by UK-based Soil Machine Dynamics, Nautilus Minerals Inc. was the first company of its kind to announce plans to begin full-scale undersea excavation of mineral deposits. However a dispute with the government of Papua-New Guinea delayed production and operations until early 2018. In September 2019, it was announced that the project had collapsed as Nautilus Minerals Inc. went into administration and its major creditors sought to recoup the millions of dollars they had sunk into the project. The Prime Minister of Papua New Guinea called the project a "total failure", sparking calls for a deep sea mining moratorium from his Pacific counterparts.

An additional site that is being explored and looked at as a potential deep sea mining site is the Clarion-Clipperton Fracture Zone (CCZ). The CCZ stretches over 4.5 million square kilometers of the Northern Pacific Ocean between Hawaii and Mexico. Scattered across the abyssal plain are trillions of polymetallic nodules, potato-sized rocklike deposits containing minerals such as magnesium, nickel, copper, zinc, cobalt, and others. Development of technologies to collect polymetallic nodules in the CCZ began in the 1970s when oil, gas and mining majors including Shell, Rio Tinto (Kennecott) and Sumitomo, conducted pilot test work, recovering over ten thousand tons of nodules.  Polymetallic nodules are also abundant in the Central Indian Ocean Basin and the Peru Basin. Mining claims registered with the International Seabed Authority (ISA) are mostly located in the CCZ, most commonly in the manganese nodule province. The ISA has entered into 18 different contracts with private companies and national governments to explore the suitability of polymetallic nodule mining in the CCZ.

In 2019, the government of the Cook Islands passed two legislative bills pertaining to deep sea mining in the country's EEZ. The Sea Bed Minerals (SBM) Act of 2019  was passed to "enable the effective and responsible management of the seabed minerals of the Cook Islands in a way that also...seeks to maximize the benefits of seabed minerals for present and future generations of Cook Islanders." Sea Bed Minerals (Exploration) Regulations Act and the Sea Bed Minerals Amendment Act were passed by Parliament in 2020 and 2021 respectively. As much as 12 billion tons of polymetallic nodules are spread across the ocean floor in the Cook Island's EEZ. The nodules found in the EEZ contain cobalt, nickel, manganese, titanium, and Rare Earth Elements.

On November 10, 2020, the Chinese submersible Fendouzhe reached the bottom of the Mariana Trench 10,909 meters (35,790 feet). It didn't surpass the record of American undersea explorer Victor Vescovo who claimed 10,927 meters (35,853 feet) in May 2019. Chief designer of the submersible, Ye Cong said the seabed was abundant with resources and a "treasure map" can be made of the deep sea.

Extraction methods
Each of the different deep sea mining resource will involve different technology.

New robotics and AI solutions are in development to minimize the environment damage and improve the economics.

Recent technological advancements have given rise to the use remotely operated vehicles (ROVs) to collect mineral samples from prospective mine sites. Using drills and other cutting tools, the ROVs obtain samples to be analyzed for precious materials. Once a site has been located, a mining ship or station is set up to mine the area.

There are two predominant forms of mineral extraction being considered for full-scale operations: continuous-line bucket system (CLB) and the hydraulic suction system. The CLB system is the preferred method of nodule collection. It operates much like a conveyor-belt, running from the sea floor to the surface of the ocean where a ship or mining platform extracts the desired minerals, and returns the tailings to the ocean. Hydraulic suction mining lowers a pipe to the seafloor which transfers nodules up to the mining ship. Another pipe from the ship to the seafloor returns the tailings to the area of the mining site.

In recent years, the most promising mining areas have been the Central and Eastern Manus Basin around Papua New Guinea and the crater of Conical Seamount to the east. These locations have shown promising amounts of gold in the area's sulfide deposits (an average of 26 parts per million). The relatively shallow water depth of 1050 m, along with the close proximity of a gold processing plant makes for an excellent mining site.

Deep sea mining project value chain can be differentiated using the criteria of the type of activities where the value is actually added. During prospecting, exploration and resource assessment phases the value is added to intangible assets, for the extraction, processing and distribution phases the value increases with relation to product processing. There is an intermediate phase – the pilot mining test which could be considered to be an inevitable step in the shift from “resources” to “reserves” classification, where the actual value starts.

Exploration phase involves such operations as locating, sea bottom scanning and sampling using technologies such as echo-sounders, side scan sonars, deep-towed photography, ROVs, AUVs. The resource valuation incorporates the examination of data in the context of potential mining feasibility.

Value chain based on product processing involves such operations as actual mining (or extraction), vertical transport, storing, offloading, transport, metallurgical processing for final products. Unlike the exploration phase, the value increases after each operation on processed material eventually delivered to the metal market. Logistics involves technologies analogous to those applied in land mines. This is also the case for the metallurgical processing, although rich and polymetallic mineral composition which distinguishes marine minerals from its land analogs requires special treatment of the deposit. Environmental monitoring and impact assessment analysis relate to the temporal and spatial discharges of the mining system if they occur, sediment plumes, disturbance to the benthic environment and the analysis of the regions affected by seafloor machines. The step involves an examination of disturbances near the seafloor, as well as disturbances near the surface. Observations include baseline comparisons for the sake of quantitative impact assessments for ensuring the sustainability of the mining process.

Small scale mining of the deep sea floor is being developed off the coast of Papua New Guinea using robotic techniques, but the obstacles are formidable.

Environmental impacts
As with all mining operations, deep sea mining raises questions about potential environmental damages to the surrounding areas. Because deep sea mining is a relatively new field, the complete consequences of full-scale mining operations are under investigation.

Newer technology which is being developed has the potential to avoid sediment plumes and use selective pick up technology. Selective pickup avoids picking up any nodules which contain life and can be programmed to leave behind a percentage of the nodules to maintain the habitat. This is not possible with dredging collector machines.

However, experts are certain that removal of parts of the sea floor will result in disturbances to the benthic layer, increased toxicity of the water column, and sediment plumes from tailings. Removing parts of the sea floor disturbs the habitat of benthic organisms, possibly, depending on the type of mining and location, causing permanent disturbances. Aside from direct impact of mining the area, leakage, spills, and corrosion could alter the mining area's chemical makeup.

Among the impacts of deep sea mining, it is theorized that sediment plumes could have the greatest impact. Plumes are caused when the tailings from mining (usually fine particles) are dumped back into the ocean, creating a cloud of particles floating in the water. Two types of plumes occur: near-bottom plumes and surface plumes. Near-bottom plumes occur when the tailings are pumped back down to the mining site. The floating particles increase the turbidity, or cloudiness, of the water, clogging filter-feeding apparatuses used by benthic organisms. Surface plumes cause a more serious problem. Depending on the size of the particles and water currents the plumes could spread over vast areas. The plumes could impact zooplankton and light penetration, in turn affecting the food web of the area. Further research has been conducted by the Massachusetts Institute of Technology to investigate how these plumes travel through water and how their ecological impact could be mitigated. This research is used to contribute to the work of the International Seabed Authority, the body which is mandated to develop, implement and enforce rules for deep-sea mining activities within its area of responsibility, in gaining a full understanding of the environmental impacts.

Many opponents to deep sea mining efforts point to the threats of grave and irreversible damage it could cause to fragile deep sea ecosystems. For this reason, organizations Fauna and Flora International and World Wide Fund for Nature, broadcaster David Attenborough, and companies BMW, Google, Volvo Cars and Samsung have called for a global moratorium on deep sea mining.

Marine life 
Research shows that polymetallic nodule fields are hotspots of abundance and diversity for a highly vulnerable abyssal fauna. Because deep sea mining is a relatively new field, the complete consequences of full-scale mining operations on this ecosystem are unknown. However, some researchers have said they believe that removal of parts of the sea floor will result in disturbances to the benthic layer, increased toxicity of the water column and sediment plumes from tailings. Removing parts of the sea floor could disturb the habitat of benthic organisms, with unknown long-term effects. Preliminary studies on seabed disturbances from mining-related activities have indicated that it takes decades for the seabed to recover from minor disturbances. Minerals targeted by seabed mining activities take millions of years to regenerate, if they do so at all. Aside from the direct impact of mining the area, some researchers and environmental activists have raised concerns about leakage, spills and corrosion that could alter the mining area’s chemical makeup.

Polymetallic Nodule fields form some of the few areas of hard substrate on the pelagic red clay bottom, attracting macrofauna. In 2013, Researchers from the University of Hawaii at Manoa conducted a baseline study of benthic communities in the CCZ, assessing a 350 square mile area with a remote-operated vehicle (ROV). They found that the area surveyed contained one of the most diverse megafaunal communities recorded on the abyssal plain. The megafauna (species greater than 0.78 inches) surveyed included glass sponges, anemones, eyeless fish, sea stars, psychropotes, amphipods, and isopods. Macrofauna (species greater than 0.5mm) were found to have very high local species diversity, with 80 -100 macrofaunal species per square meter. The highest species diversity was found living amongst the polymetallic nodules. In a follow-up survey, researchers identified over 1000 species, 90% of them previously unknown, and over 50% of them dependent on the polymetallic nodules for survival; all were identified in areas demarcated for potential seabed mining. Many scientists believe that seabed mining is posed to irreparably harm fragile abyssal plain habitats. Despite the potential environmental impacts, research shows that the loss of biomass involved in Deep Sea Mining is significantly smaller than the expected loss of biomass as a result of land ore mining. It is estimated that with the continued process of land ore mining will lead to a loss of 568 megatons (approximately the same as that of the entire human population) of biomass whereas projections of the potential environmental impact of Deep Sea Mining will lead to a loss of 42 megatons of biomass. In addition to the loss of biomass, land ore mining will lead to a loss of 47 trillion megafauna organisms, whereas deep-sea mining is expected to lead to a loss of 3 trillion megafauna organisms.

A rare species called 'Scaly-foot snail', also known as sea pangolin, has become first species to be threatened because of deep sea mining.

Sediment plumes 
Among the impacts of deep sea mining, sediment plumes could have the greatest impact. Plumes are caused when the tailings from mining (usually fine particles) are dumped back into the ocean, creating a cloud of particles floating in the water. Two types of plumes occur: near bottom plumes and surface plumes. Near bottom plumes occur when the tailings are pumped back down to the mining site. The floating particles increase the turbidity, or cloudiness, of the water, clogging filter-feeding apparatuses used by benthic organisms. Surface plumes cause a more serious problem. Depending on the size of the particles and water currents the plumes could spread over vast areas. The plumes could impact zooplankton and light penetration, in turn affecting the food web of the area. A study conducted in Portmán Bay (Murcia, Spain) revealed that sediment plumes carry concentrations of metals that can accumulate in tissues of shellfish and persist for several hours after initial mining activities. Mine tailing deposits and resuspension plume sites caused the worst environmental conditions of their area compared to sites just off the mine tailing deposits, leaving significant ecotoxicological impacts on fauna within a short period of time. The accumulation of toxic metals in an organism, known as bioaccumulation, works its way through the food web causing detrimental health effects in larger organisms and essentially humans.

Noise and light pollution 
Deep sea mining efforts will increase ambient noise in the normally-quiet pelagic environments. Anthropogenic noise is known to affect deep sea fish species and marine mammals. Impacts include behavior changes, communication difficulties, and temporary and permanent hearing damage.

The areas where Deep Sea Mining may take places are normally devoid of sunlight and anthropogenic light sources. Mining efforts employing floodlighting would drastically increase light levels. Previous studies show that deep sea shrimps found at hydrothermal vents suffered permanent retinal damage when exposed to floodlights from crewed submersibles. Behavioral changes include vertical migration patterns, ability to communicate, and detect prey. Each source of pollution contribute to alterations of ecosystems beyond points of immediate recovery.

Laws and regulations 
The international law–based regulations on deep sea mining are contained in the United Nations Conventions on the Law of the Sea from 1973 to 1982, which came into force in 1994. The convention set up the International Seabed Authority (ISA), which regulates nations’ deep sea mining ventures outside each nations’ Exclusive Economic Zone (a  area surrounding coastal nations). The ISA requires nations interested in mining to explore two equal mining sites and turn one over to the ISA, along with a transfer of mining technology over a 10- to 20-year period. This seemed reasonable at the time because it was widely believed that nodule mining would be extremely profitable. However, these strict requirements led some industrialized countries to refuse to sign the initial treaty in 1982.

The United States abides by the Deep Seabed Hard Mineral Resources Act, which was originally written in 1980. This legislation is largely recognized as one of the main concerns the US has with ratifying UNCLOS.

Deep sea mining efforts within the EEZ of nation states seabed mining comes under the jurisdiction of national laws.  Despite extensive exploration both within and outside of EEZs, only a few countries, notably New Zealand, have established legal and institutional frameworks for the future development of deep seabed mining.

Papua New Guinea was the first country to approve a permit for the exploration of minerals in the deep seabed. Solwara 1 was awarded its licence and environmental permits despite three independent reviews of the environmental impact statement mine finding significant gaps and flaws in the underlying science.

The ISA has recently arranged a workshop in Australia where scientific experts, industry representatives, legal specialists and academics worked towards improving existing regulations and ensuring that development of seabed minerals does not cause serious and permanent damage to the marine environment.

A moratorium on deep sea mining was adopted at the Global biodiversity summit in 2021. Some argue that deep sea mining is needed for producing Electric vehicles and batteries, but according to Jessica Battle, an expert on ocean policy and governance: "We can decarbonize through innovation, redesigning, reducing, reusing, and recycling."

Controversy 
An article in the Harvard Environmental Law Review in April 2018 argued that "the 'new global gold rush' of deep sea mining shares many features with past resource scrambles – including a general disregard for environmental and social impacts, and the marginalisation of indigenous peoples and their rights". The Foreshore and Seabed Act (2004) ignited fierce indigenous opposition in New Zealand, as its claiming of the seabed for the Crown in order to open it up to mining conflicted with Māori claims to their customary lands, who protested the Act as a "sea grab". Later, this act was repealed after an investigation from the UN Commission on Human Rights upheld charges of discrimination. The Act was subsequently repealed and replaced with the Marine and Coastal Area Bill (2011). However, conflicts between indigenous sovereignty and seabed mining continue. Organizations like the Deep Sea Mining Campaign and Alliance of Solwara Warriors, comprising 20 communities in the Bismarck and Solomon Sea, are examples of organizations that are seeking to ban seabed mining in Papua New Guinea, where the Solwara 1 project is set to occur, and in the Pacific. They argue primarily that decision-making about deep sea mining has not adequately addressed Free Prior and Informed Consent from affected communities and  have not adhered to the precautionary principle, a rule proposed by the 1982 UN World Charter for Nature which informs the ISA regulatory framework for mineral exploitation of the deep sea.

History 
In the 1960s, the prospect of deep-sea mining was brought up by the publication of J. L. Mero's Mineral Resources of the Sea. The book claimed that nearly limitless supplies of cobalt, nickel and other 
metals could be found throughout the planet's oceans. Mero stated that these metals occurred in deposits of manganese nodules, which appear as lumps of compressed flowers on the seafloor at 
depths of about 5,000 m. Some nations including France, Germany and the United States sent out research vessels in search of nodule deposits. Initial estimates of deep sea mining viability turned out to be much exaggerated. This overestimate, coupled with depressed metal prices, led to the near abandonment of nodule mining by 1982. From the 1960s to 1984 an estimated US $650 million had 
been spent on the venture, with little to no return.

Timeline of contemporary developments

Deep sea mining equipment

See also 

 
 
 
 , the process of creating holes for oil mining in deep sea.
, concretions of manganese and other minerals formed over thousands of years on the abyssal plains; sought after for deep sea mining projects.
, location of interest for deep sea mining

References

External links
The Deep Sea Mining Summit 2023 "The international forum for deep sea mining professionals"
"Who Will Claim Common Heritage?–Corporate interests endanger international agreement on deep seabed minerals" in Multinational Monitor
Deep Sea Mining – 8 min video on Australian science TV, June 2011
Geophysical Methods for the Mapping of Deep-Sea Mineral Deposits – November 2014 Ocean News & Technology magazine

"Why are countries laying claim to the deep-sea floor?" - BBC article 21 June 2017
 Assessment of the Different technologies for Vertical Hydraulic Transport in Deep Seam Mining Applications
Mining the Deep Sea

Underwater mining
Mining
Oceans